Ezz-thetics is a studio album by the George Russell sextet, released on Riverside Records in mid-1961.

Recording and music
The album was recorded in May 1961. In addition to himself on piano, Russell's sextet contained trumpeter Don Ellis, trombonist Dave Baker, Eric Dolphy  on alto sax and bass clarinet, Steve Swallow on bass, and
Joe Hunt on drums. Three of the tracks were written by Russell. It features a radical reworking of Thelonious Monk's standard "Round Midnight" with an extended solo by Eric Dolphy.

Reception

The AllMusic reviewer described the album as "a true classic", and added that, "although using ideas from avant-garde jazz, it does not fall into any simple category". The Penguin Guide to Jazz suggested that it was a good place in Russell's discography for a listener to start.

Track listing 

 "Ezz-thetic" (Russell) – 8:57
 "Nardis" (Miles Davis) – 4:34
 "Lydiot" (Russell) – 8:06
 "Thoughts" (Russell) – 5:26
 "Honesty" (David Baker) – 8:55
 "Round Midnight" (Thelonious Monk) – 6:29
 "Kige's Tune" (Al Kiger)  (take 2) *
 "Kige's Tune" (Al Kiger) (take 5) *

* Bonus tracks, issued for the first time on 2007 CD remaster:

Personnel 
George Russell - piano, arranger
Don Ellis - trumpet
Dave Baker - trombone
Eric Dolphy - alto sax, bass clarinet
Steve Swallow - bass
Joe Hunt - drums

References

1961 albums
George Russell (composer) albums
Avant-garde jazz albums
Free jazz albums
Post-bop albums
Riverside Records albums
Albums produced by Orrin Keepnews
Albums arranged by George Russell (composer)